Pennsylvania Dental College may refer to the following institutions:
 University of Pennsylvania School of Dental Medicine, founded 1878
 Pennsylvania College of Dental Surgery, founded 1856, absorbed by University of Pennsylvania School of Dental Medicine in 1909